Sally Margaret Field (born November 6, 1946) is an American actress. Known for her extensive work on screen and stage, she has received numerous accolades throughout her career spanning over five decades, including two Academy Awards, two Golden Globe Awards, and three Primetime Emmy Awards, in addition to nominations for a Tony Award and two British Academy Film Awards. She was presented with a star on the Hollywood Walk of Fame in 2014, the Kennedy Center Honor in 2019, and a Screen Actors Guild Life Achievement Award in 2023.

Field began her career on television, starring in the comedies Gidget (1965–1966), The Flying Nun (1967–1970), and The Girl with Something Extra (1973–1974). She received the Primetime Emmy Award for Outstanding Lead Actress in a Limited Series or Movie for the NBC television film Sybil (1976). Her film debut was as an extra in Moon Pilot (1962) followed by starring roles in Stay Hungry (1976), The Way West (1976) Smokey and the Bandit (1977), Heroes (1977), The End (1978), and Hooper (1978). She won two Academy Awards for Best Actress for Norma Rae (1979), and Places in the Heart (1984). Other notable roles include in Smokey and the Bandit II (1980), Absence of Malice (1981), Kiss Me Goodbye (1982), Murphy's Romance (1985), Steel Magnolias (1989), Soapdish (1991), Mrs. Doubtfire (1993), and Forrest Gump (1994). 

In the 2000s, Field returned to television with a recurring role on the NBC medical drama ER, for which she won the Primetime Emmy Award for Outstanding Guest Actress in a Drama Series in 2001. For her role of Nora Walker in the ABC drama series Brothers & Sisters (2006-2011), Field won the Primetime Emmy Award for Outstanding Lead Actress in a Drama Series. She portrayed Mary Todd Lincoln in Lincoln (2012), for which she received an Academy Award for Best Supporting Actress nomination. She portrayed Aunt May in The Amazing Spider-Man (2012) and its 2014 sequel. Other roles include in the films Hello, My Name Is Doris (2015), and 80 for Brady (2023), as well as in the Netflix limited series Maniac (2018).

She made her professional stage debut in the Broadway revival of Edward Albee's The Goat, or Who Is Sylvia? in 2002. Field returned to the stage after an absence of 15 years with the 2017 revival of Tennessee Williams's The Glass Menagerie, for which she received a nomination for the Tony Award for Best Actress in a Play. She made her debut on the West End theatre in the revival of Arthur Miller's All My Sons in 2019.

Early life
Sally Field was born on November 6, 1946, in Pasadena, California, to Margaret Field (née Morlan), an actress, and Richard Dryden Field, who served in the Army during World War II. Her brother is Richard D. Field, a physicist and an academic. Her parents were divorced in 1950; afterward, her mother married Jock Mahoney, an actor and a stuntman. Field said in her 2018 memoir that she was sexually abused by Mahoney during her childhood.

As a teen, Field attended Portola Middle School and Birmingham High School in Van Nuys, where she was a cheerleader. Her classmates included financier Michael Milken, actress Cindy Williams, and talent agent Michael Ovitz.

Career

1965–1976 

Field got her start on television as the boy-crazy surfer girl in the sitcom Gidget (1965–1966). The show was not an initial success and was cancelled after a single season; however, summer reruns garnered respectable ratings, making the show a belated success. Wanting to find a new starring vehicle for Field, ABC next produced The Flying Nun with Field cast as Sister Bertrille for three seasons, from 1967 to 1970. In an interview included on the Season One DVD release, Field said that she thoroughly enjoyed Gidget but hated The Flying Nun because she was not treated with respect by the show's directors. Field was then typecast, finding respectable roles difficult to obtain. In 1971, Field starred in the ABC television film Maybe I'll Come Home in the Spring, playing a discouraged teen runaway who returns home with a bearded, drug-abusing hippie (played by David Carradine). She made several guest television appearances through the mid-1970s, including a role on the Western Alias Smith and Jones, a popular series starring Gidget co-star Pete Duel. She also appeared in the episode "Whisper" on the thriller Night Gallery.

In 1973, Field was cast in a starring role opposite John Davidson in the short-lived series The Girl with Something Extra that aired from 1973 to 1974. Following the series' cancellation, Field studied at the Actors Studio with acting teacher Lee Strasberg. Strasberg became a mentor to Field, helping her move past her television image of the girl next door. During this period, Field divorced her first husband in 1975.

Soon after studying with Strasberg, Field landed the title role in the 1976 television film Sybil, based on the book by Flora Rheta Schreiber. Her dramatic portrayal of a young woman afflicted with dissociative identity disorder earned her an Emmy Award for Outstanding Lead Actress in a Special Program – Drama or Comedy in 1977 and enabled her to break through the typecasting of her sitcom work.

1977–1989
In 1977, Field co-starred with Burt Reynolds, Jackie Gleason, and Jerry Reed in the year's second-highest-grossing film, Smokey and the Bandit. In 1979, she played the titular union organizer in Norma Rae, a film that established her as a dramatic actress. Vincent Canby, reviewing the film for The New York Times, wrote: "Norma Rae is a seriously concerned contemporary drama, illuminated by some very good performances and one, Miss Field's, that is spectacular." For her role in Norma Rae, Field won the Best Female Performance Prize at the Cannes Film Festival and the Academy Award for Best Actress.

Field appeared with Reynolds in three more films: The End, Hooper, and Smokey and the Bandit II. In 1981, she continued to change her image, playing a foul-mouthed prostitute opposite Tommy Lee Jones in the South-set film Back Roads. She was nominated for a Golden Globe for the 1981 drama Absence of Malice and the 1982 comedy Kiss Me Goodbye.

Then came a second Oscar for her starring role in the 1984 drama Places in the Heart. Field's acceptance speech has since been both admired as earnest and parodied as excessive. She said, "Oh Benton, what you did for me. You changed my life, truly! This means so much more to me this time. I don't know why, I think the first time I hardly felt it because it was all so new. I owe a lot to the cast, to my players. To Lindsay and John and Danny, and Ed and Amy, and my little friends, Gennie and Yankton. I owe a lot to my family for holding me together and loving me and having patience with this obsession of me. But I want to 'thank you' to you. I haven't had an orthodox career. And I've wanted more than anything to have your respect. The first time I didn't feel it, but this time I feel it. And I can't deny the fact that you like me...right now...you like me! (applause) Thank you!" Field was making a humorous reference to dialog from her role in Norma Rae, but many people missed the connection. Field later parodied herself when she delivered the line (often misquoted as "You like me, you really like me!") in a Charles Schwab commercial.

In 1985, she co-starred with James Garner in the romantic comedy Murphy's Romance. In A&E's biography of Garner, she cited her on-screen kiss with Garner as the best cinematic kiss she ever had. The following year, Field appeared on the cover of the March 1986 issue of Playboy magazine, in which she was the interview subject. She did not appear as a pictorial subject in the magazine, although she did wear the classic leotard and bunny-ears outfit on the cover. That year, she received the Women in Film Crystal Award. For her role as matriarch M'Lynn in the film version of Steel Magnolias (1989), she was nominated for a 1990 Golden Globe Award for Best Actress.

1990–present

Field had supporting roles in a number of other movies, including Mrs. Doubtfire (1993), in which she played the wife of Robin Williams's character and the love interest of Pierce Brosnan's character. She then played Tom Hanks's mother in Forrest Gump (1994), even though she was only 10 years older than Hanks, with whom she had co-starred six years earlier in Punchline.

Field's other 1990s films included Not Without My Daughter, a controversial thriller based on the real-life experience of Betty Mahmoody's escape from Iran with her daughter Mahtob; and Soapdish, a comedy in which she played a pampered soap-opera star and was joined by an all-star cast, including Kevin Kline, Whoopi Goldberg, Elisabeth Shue, and Robert Downey, Jr. In 1996, Field reprised her role as Sassy in Homeward Bound 2: Lost in San Francisco and later that year, she received the Berlinale Camera award at the 46th Berlin International Film Festival for her role as a grieving vigilante mother in director John Schlesinger's film Eye for an Eye. In 1997, Field guest starred on the King of the Hill episode "Hilloween", in which she voiced religious woman Junie Harper, who contends with Hank Hill (Mike Judge) to ban Halloween. She co-starred with Natalie Portman in Where the Heart Is (2000), and appeared opposite Reese Witherspoon in Legally Blonde 2: Red, White & Blonde.

Field had a recurring role on ER in the 2000–2001 season as Dr. Abby Lockhart's mother, Maggie, who suffers from bipolar disorder, a role for which she won an Emmy Award in 2001. After her critically acclaimed stint on the show, she returned to the role in 2003 and 2006. She also starred in the very short-lived 2002 series The Court.

Field's directorial career began with the television film The Christmas Tree (1996). In 1998, she directed the episode "The Original Wives' Club" of the critically acclaimed TV miniseries From the Earth to the Moon, also playing a minor role as Trudy, the wife of astronaut Gordon Cooper. In 2000, she directed the feature film Beautiful.

Field was a late addition to the ABC drama Brothers & Sisters, which debuted in September 2006. In the show's pilot, the role of matriarch Nora Walker was played by Betty Buckley. However, the show's producers decided to take the character in another direction, and offered the part to Field, who won the 2007 Emmy Award for Outstanding Lead Actress in a Drama Series for her performance. The drama also starred Calista Flockhart and Rachel Griffiths as Nora's adult daughters. In November 2009, Field appeared on an episode of The Doctors to talk about osteoporosis and her Rally With Sally Foundation.

She portrayed Aunt May in the Marvel Comics films The Amazing Spider-Man (2012) as well as the 2014 sequel. Field's widely praised portrayal of Mary Todd Lincoln in Steven Spielberg's film Lincoln, also in 2012, brought her Best Supporting Actress Award nominations at the Oscars, Golden Globes, BAFTA, and Screen Actors Guild.

On May 5, 2014, Field received a star on the Hollywood Walk of Fame for her contributions to motion pictures. Her star is located in front of the Hollywood Wax Museum. In January 2015, it was announced that she would co-host TCM. The same year, Field portrayed the titular character in Hello, My Name Is Doris, for which she was nominated for the Critics' Choice Movie Award for Best Actress in a Comedy.

In 2017, Field reprised her role as Amanda Wingfield in The Glass Menagerie on Broadway at the Belasco Theatre. Performances began on February 7, 2017, in previews, and officially opened on March 9. The production closed on May 21, 2017. Field had previously played the role in the Kennedy Center production in 2004. She was nominated for a Tony Award for Best Actress in a Play for her performance. Her memoir, In Pieces, was published by Grand Central Publishing in September 2018.

Field returned to episodic television in 2018, starring in the Netflix miniseries Maniac.  Subsequently, in 2020, Field starred in the AMC series Dispatches from Elsewhere.

In 2022, it was announced that Field would be a co-star in an upcoming comedy movie entitled 80 for Brady, which would star NFL quarterback Tom Brady along with fellow actresses Jane Fonda, Lily Tomlin and Rita Moreno.  

In 2023, Field was named the 58th recipient of the Screen Actors Guild Life Achievement Award, which she will be presented at the 29th Screen Actors Guild Awards.

Personal life
Field was married to Steven Craig from 1968 to 1975, though they separated in 1973. The couple had two sons: Peter Craig, a novelist and screenwriter; and Eli Craig, an actor and director.

From 1976 to 1980, Field had a relationship with Burt Reynolds, during which time they co-starred in four films: Smokey and the Bandit, Smokey and the Bandit II, The End, and Hooper. Following their 1980 breakup, Field and Reynolds continued to date on and off before splitting permanently in 1982.

Field married her second husband, Alan Greisman, in 1984. Together, they had one son, Sam, in 1987. Field and Greisman divorced in 1994.

On October 29, 1988, at Aspen/Pitkin County Airport in Colorado, Field and three members of her family were in a private plane owned by media mogul Merv Griffin when it lost power and rejected takeoff, slamming into parked aircraft. They all survived with minor injuries.

Philanthropy and activism
In 2005, Field was diagnosed with osteoporosis. Her diagnosis led her to create the "Rally with Sally for Bone Health" campaign with support from Roche and GlaxoSmithKline that controversially co-promoted Boniva, a bisphosphonate treatment for osteoporosis. Field's campaign encouraged the early diagnosis of such conditions through technology such as bone-density scans.

In 2005, Field received the Golden Plate Award of the American Academy of Achievement presented in recognition of her lifetime of contributions to the arts as well as her dedication as a social activist.

During her acceptance speech at the 2007 Emmy Awards, when she won for Outstanding Lead Actress in a Drama Series, Field said: "If the mothers ruled the world, there would be no goddamn wars in the first place." Fox Broadcasting Company, which aired the show, cut the sound and picture after the word "god" and did not return camera/sound to the stage until after Field finished talking. An e-mail statement from the company the day after the incident explained that the censorship of Field's speech (among two other censorship incidents during the award ceremony) occurred because "some language during the live broadcast may have been considered inappropriate by some viewers. As a result, Fox's broadcast standards executives determined it appropriate to drop sound and picture during those portions of the show."

Field is an advocate for women's rights. She has served on the board of directors of Vital Voices Global Partnership, an international women's NGO, and has co-hosted the Global Leadership Awards six times. A Democrat, Field supported Hillary Clinton's bid for the Democratic Party nomination in the 2008 presidential election.

Field is also an advocate for gay rights, and won the Human Rights Campaign's Ally for Equality Award in 2012. Her youngest son, Samuel Greisman, is gay.

Field was arrested on December 13, 2019, while attending Jane Fonda's weekly Friday climate change protests in Washington, D.C.

Bibliography

Discography

Singles
"Felicidad" (Billboard No. 94, Cashbox No. 91) / "Find Yourself a Rainbow" – Colgems 1008 – August 1967 
"Follow the Star" (Both sides, promo only) – Colgems 107 – December 1967
"Golden Days" / "You're a Grand Old Flag" – Colgems 1014 – January 1968
"Gonna Build a Mountain" / "Months of the Year" (also features Flying Nun co-stars Madeleine Sherwood and Marge Redmond) – Colgems 1030 – September 1968

Album
Star of The Flying Nun—Colgems COM-106 (Mono) / COS-106 (Stereo) – Billboard No. 172, December 1967

Awards and nominations

References

External links

 
 
 
 
 
 
 
 
 Actress Sally Field On Hollywood, Family and Aging, an NPR Interview, June 3, 2009 (streaming audio)

1946 births
Living people
20th-century American actresses
21st-century American actresses
Activists from California
Actresses from Pasadena, California
American child actresses
American women singers
American film actresses
American people of English descent
American television actresses
American voice actresses
American women film directors
Best Actress Academy Award winners
Best Drama Actress Golden Globe (film) winners
Cannes Film Festival Award for Best Actress winners
California Democrats
Colgems Records artists
Method actors
Fellows of the American Academy of Arts and Sciences
Film directors from California
Lee Strasberg Theatre and Film Institute alumni
American LGBT rights activists
Outstanding Performance by a Lead Actress in a Drama Series Primetime Emmy Award winners
Outstanding Performance by a Female Actor in a Drama Series Screen Actors Guild Award winners
Outstanding Performance by a Lead Actress in a Miniseries or Movie Primetime Emmy Award winners
Survivors of aviation accidents or incidents
Birmingham High School alumni
Kennedy Center honorees